Humphreys County Airport  is a county-owned public-use airport located three nautical miles (6 km) northeast of the central business district of Waverly, a city in Humphreys County, Tennessee, United States.

Facilities and aircraft 
It has one asphalt paved runway designated 3/21 which measures 4,000 by 75 feet (1,219 x 23 m).

For the 12-month period ending July 12, 2000, the airport had 11,860 aircraft operations, an average of 32 per day: 92% general aviation, 4% air taxi and 4% military. At that time there were 18 aircraft based at this airport: 78% single-engine, 6% multi-engine and 17% ultralight.

References

External links 

Airports in Tennessee
Buildings and structures in Humphreys County, Tennessee
Transportation in Humphreys County, Tennessee